Kokai Maru was a Japanese cargo steamship. She was built in Hokkaido in 1939, and sunk in the Pacific Ocean by United States Navy aircraft in 1944.

Building
The Hakodate Dock Company built Kokai Maru, completing her in 1939.

She had a single screw, driven by a three-cylinder triple expansion engine. Exhaust steam from her engine's low-pressure cylinder drove a compressor, which re-pressurised steam exhausted from the high-pressure cylinder before it entered the intermediate-pressure cylinder. Compressing the steam also increased its temperature, counter-acting steam's tendency to condense as it expands.

Kokai Marus owner was Simatani Kisen Kabushiki Kaisha, who registered her at Kobe. Her wireless telegraph call sign was JOSJ.

War service and loss

In 1941 the Imperial Japanese Navy requisitioned Kokai Maru. On 10 March 1942, during the Japanese invasion of Salamaua–Lae, US Navy SBD Dauntless aircraft from the carriers  and  damaged her off Lae, New Guinea.

On 21 February 1944 Kokai Maru was part of a convoy off New Hanover Island. USAAF B-25 Mitchell aircraft bombed her, and she sank at position . 50 people aboard the ship were killed.

References

Bibliography

1939 ships
Maritime incidents in February 1944
Ships sunk by US aircraft
Shipwrecks of Papua New Guinea
Steamships of Japan
World War II merchant ships of Japan
World War II shipwrecks in the Pacific Ocean